Harry Gowan Leavell (July 16, 1879 – death date unknown), nicknamed "Ha Ha", was an American Negro league first baseman between 1908 and 1911.

A native of Hopkinsville, Kentucky, Leavell played for the Cuban Giants in 1908 and 1911.

In 1915, he managed the Giants.

References

External links
Baseball statistics and player information from Baseball-Reference Black Baseball Stats and Seamheads

1879 births
Year of death missing
Place of death missing
Cuban Giants players
Baseball first basemen
Baseball players from Kentucky
Sportspeople from Hopkinsville, Kentucky